Aspergillus aerius is a species of fungus in the genus Aspergillus. It is from the Aspergillus section. The species was first described in 2017. It has been isolated from an air treatment system in a production plant in the Netherlands. It has been reported to produce auroglaucin, bisanthrons, dihydroauroglaucin, echinulins, erythroglaucin, flavoglaucin, isoechinulins, neoechinulins, physcion, tetracyclic, and tetrahydroauroglaucin.

References 

aerius
Fungi described in 2017